Ángel Lombarte is a Spanish actor.

He appeared in La piel quemada, The Blood Spattered Bride (1972), starring Simón Andreu, Maribel Martin, Alexandra Bastedo and Dean Selmier; La collera del vento (1970), starring Maria Grazia Buccella and Terence Hill, and Frauds (1963), both directed by Mario Camus; Trigo limpio (1962), and The Shame of the Sabine Women (1962), by Alberto Gout.

Filmography

References

External links
 

Date of birth missing
Date of death missing
20th-century Spanish male actors
Spanish male film actors